John Philip Bughaw, popularly known as Balang (born November 7, 2008), is a Filipino child dancer and actor. Balang started dancing when he was 4 years old and his cover of Justin Bieber’s "Sorry" has been viewed more than 8 million times having him recognized by Ellen DeGeneres. He since guested on The Ellen DeGeneres Show several times.

Filmography

References 

 Balang returns to 'Ellen,' dances to Ed Sheeran hit Retrieved 2017-06-08.
 Balang dances to Ed Sheeran’s 'Shape of You' Retrieved 2017-06-08.
 WATCH: Dancing boy Balang back on 'Ellen,' has dance-off with tWitch Retrieved 2017-06-08.
 Balang dancing to Ed Sheeran's 'Shape of You' hits 5M views Retrieved 2017-06-08.
 'Balang' grooves to Ed Sheeran's hit song for 4th 'Ellen' guesting Retrieved 2017-06-08.
 Balang’s ‘infectious’ performance on Dawn French’s Little Big Shots steals the show Retrieved 2017-06-08.
 Balang-binigyan-ng-social-media-award Retrieved 2017-06-08.

External links 
 
 Balang's profile on GMA Network

2008 births
Filipino male child actors
Filipino male dancers
Living people